Harcourt Park may refer to:

 Harcourt Park - A cottaging enclave in Canada.
 Harcourt Park - The real-life setting for Isengard in The Lord of the Rings: The Fellowship of the Ring (2001).
 Harcourt Garden, Hong Kong, also known as Harcourt Park